The State Street Bridge in Erie, Kansas brings State Street over a tributary of the Neosho River.  It is a reinforced concrete arch bridge which was built in 1924.  It was listed on the National Register of Historic Places in 1985.

It has a reinforced concrete arch between concrete abutments.

References

Bridges on the National Register of Historic Places in Kansas
Bridges completed in 1924
Neosho County, Kansas
Bridges in Kansas